Jeremy Warmsley is a London-based musician and composer.

Biography
From 2005 to 2009, he worked as a solo artist, recording two albums for Transgressive Records and touring with Regina Spektor and The Shins. Since 2009 he has worked with his wife Elizabeth Sankey as Summer Camp, releasing three albums on the Moshi Moshi label.

In 2014, he composed his first soundtrack, with Summer Camp, for Charlie Lyne's Beyond Clueless. Since then he has gone on to score several more of Charlie Lyne's films as well as Simon Amstell's mockumentary Carnage.

In 2016/17 he wrote the Tracks to the game "Jalopy" made by Greg MinksWorks, aswell as the game "Landlord's Super" made by Minskworks in 2020

On 18 September 2018, he released a new song, "Moment", which was commissioned for the BBC/Netflix drama series, Wanderlust.

In 2019, he began his 'A Year' project, releasing a series of singles, one per month. The first track, "January", was playlisted by BBC Radio 6 Music.

Filmography
 2014 Beyond Clueless - directed by Charlie Shackleton (with Summer Camp)
 2015 Fear Itself - directed by Shackleton
 2017 Carnage - directed by Simon Amstell
 2017 Fish Story - directed by Shackleton
 2017 Personal Truth - directed by Shackleton
 2018 Right Place, Wrong Tim - directed by Eros Vlahos, starring Asa Butterfield, Ella Purnell and Adam Buxton
 2021 The Afterlight - directed by Shackleton

Discography

Singles and EPs
 "I Believe In The Way You Move" – 4 July 2005, EXERCISE1 Records (200 run Limited Edition single)
 "5 Interesting Lies" – 7 November 2005, Transgressive Records (500 run EP)
 "Other People's Secrets" – 10 April 2006, Transgressive Records (500 run EP)
 "I Promise" – 10 July 2006, Transgressive Records
 "I Believe In The Way You Move (rerecording)" – 25 September 2006, Transgressive Records
 "Dirty Blue Jeans" – 18 December 2006, Transgressive Records (500 run single)
 "The Boat Song/Temptation" – April 2008, Transgressive Records (500 run single)
 "Lose My Cool" – 11 August 2008, Transgressive Records (digital single)
 "Moment" – 18 September 2018, commissioned for BBC/Netflix drama Wanderlust.
 "January" – 7  January 2019, part of his 'A Year' project.

See Summer Camp's page for their discography.

Albums
 The Art of Fiction – 9 October 2006, Transgressive Records
 How We Became – September 2008, Transgressive Records

References

External links
Official Website

English songwriters
English male singers
People educated at King's College School, London
Alumni of Churchill College, Cambridge
Singers from London
Living people
Year of birth missing (living people)
British male songwriters